Lewis Schouten (born 4 February 2004) is a Dutch professional footballer who plays as a midfielder for Dutch club AZ Alkmaar.

Career
Schouten made his league debut in the Eerste Divisie for Jong AZ appearing as a substitute on 17 January 2022 against FC Dordrecht in a 2-0 defeat at the Stadion Krommedijk. Four days later he made his first start in a 2-0 win over VVV Venlo, it was Jong AZ’s first win in four months. As well as Schouten, Mexx Meerdink and Misha Engel made their first professional starts. On the 22 April, 2022 Schouten signed a new contract with AZ to keep
him at the club until 2027. He scored his first senior league goal on February 3, 2023 in a 4-3 win against VVV Venlo.

International career
In September 2022 Schouten was included in the Dutch U19 squad.

Personal life
His father is Ronald Schouten, who played for AZ in the early 1990s.

References

2004 births
Living people
Eerste Divisie players
Dutch footballers
Association football midfielders
Jong AZ players